István Závodi, often referred to as Istvan Zavadsky and nicknamed "Pista" (pronounced Pisht'uh; born 23 February 1911, date of death unknown) was a Hungarian footballer, who capped twice for Hungary national football team.

He spent the majority of his career in France, with SO Montpellier, a team he coached later.

References

1911 births
Year of death missing
Hungarian footballers
Hungary international footballers
Hungarian expatriate footballers
Expatriate footballers in France
Montpellier HSC players
FC Sète 34 players
Ligue 1 players
Ligue 2 players
Hungarian football managers
Montpellier HSC managers
FC Sète 34 managers
FC Antibes players
Association football forwards